Dimbhe dam, is a gravity dam on Ghod River near Ambegaon, Pune district in State of Maharashtra in India.

Specifications
The dam is located in the Ghod basin and is part of the Kukadi project, which constructed five dams in the region. Other dams included in this project are Yedgaon Dam, Manikdoh Dam, Pimpalgaon Joge Dam and Wadaj Dam. A 5 MW power house is also built at the foot of this dam

Purpose
 Irrigation for the 19 villages on the fringes of the dam. It provides irrigation to about 34,000 acres of land.

See also

 Dams in Maharashtra
 List of reservoirs and dams in India

References

Dams in Pune district
Dams completed in 2000
Hydroelectric power stations in Maharashtra
2000 establishments in Maharashtra